Krimulda Municipality is a former municipality in Vidzeme, Latvia. The municipality was formed in 2009 by merging Krimulda Parish and Lēdurga Parish, the administrative centre being Ragana.

On 1 July 2021, Krimulda Municipality ceased to exist and its territory was merged into Sigulda Municipality.

See also 
 Administrative divisions of Latvia (2009)

References 

 
Former municipalities of Latvia